Edward O'Sullivan Lee OD (23 August 1941 – 6 October 2020), better known as Bunny "Striker" Lee, was a Jamaican record producer. He was known as a pioneer of the United Kingdom reggae market, licensing his productions to Trojan Records in the early 1970s, and later working with Lee "Scratch" Perry and King Tubby.

Early life 
Bunny Lee was born on 23 August 1941 and grew up in the Greenwich Farm area of Kingston, where his father was a shoemaker.

Career
Lee began his career working as a record plugger for Duke Reid's Treasure Isle label in 1962, later performing the same duties for Leslie Kong. He then moved on to work with Ken Lack, initially in an administrative role, before taking on engineering duties. Lee then moved into producing (i.e. financing) records himself, his first hit record coming with Roy Shirley's "Music Field" on WIRL in 1967. Lee then set up his own Lee's label, the first release being Lloyd Jackson's "Listen to the Beat". He produced further hits during 1967–68 by Lester Sterling and Stranger Cole, Derrick Morgan, Slim Smith and The Uniques ("My Conversation"), Pat Kelly, and The Sensations, establishing him as one of Jamaica's top producers. Between 1969 and 1972 he produced classic hits including Slim Smith's "Everybody Needs Love", Max Romeo's "Wet Dream", Delroy Wilson's "Better Must Come", Eric Donaldson's "Cherry Oh Baby", and John Holt's "Stick By Me".

Lee was a pioneer of the United Kingdom reggae market, licensing his productions to the Palmer Brothers (Pama) and Trojan Records in the early 1970s.

The mid-1970s saw Lee work with his most successful singer, Johnny Clarke, as well as Owen Gray and Cornell Campbell, and along with Lee "Scratch" Perry, he broke the dominance of Coxsone Dodd and Duke Reid. This era also saw the emergence of the "flying cymbal" sound on Lee's productions, developed by drummer Carlton 'Santa' Davis, with Lee's session band, The Aggrovators ("flying symbol" technique was started by Winston Grennan, who shared it with Davis).

Lee was instrumental in producing early dub music, working with his friend and dub pioneer King Tubby in the early 1970s.  Lee and Tubby were experimenting with new production techniques which Lee described as "implements of sound." Working with equipment that today would be considered primitive and limiting, they produced tracks that consisted of mostly the rhythm parts mixed with distorted or altered versions of a song.
With all the bass and drum ting now, dem ting just start by accident, a man sing off key, an when you a reach a dat you drop out everything an leave the drum, an lick in the bass, an cause a confusion an people like it...

Lee encouraged Tubby to mix increasingly wild dubs, sometimes including sound effects such as thunder claps and gunshots. In addition to King Tubby, dub mixers Prince Jammy and Philip Smart also worked extensively on Lee's productions, with most of Lee's dubs from 1976 onwards mixed by Jammy.

In addition to dub sides and instrumentals, Lee would be one of the first producers to realise the potential of reusing the same rhythm tracks time and time again with different singers and deejays, partly out of necessity – unlike some of the other major producers Lee did not have his own studio and had to make the most of the studio time he paid for. The latter half of the 1970s saw Lee work with some of Jamaica's top new talent, including Linval Thompson, Leroy Smart, and Barry Brown. 

By 1977 Joe Gibbs and Channel One Studios with the Hookim Brothers became "the place to be", reducing Lee's prominence.  However, during the late 1970s Lee produced almost every deejay, notably Dennis Alcapone, U-Roy, I-Roy, Prince Jazzbo, U Brown, Dr Alimantado, Jah Stitch, Trinity, and Tapper Zukie.  Most of these were quick productions, usually to classic Studio One or Treasure Isle riddims.  The aim was to get deejay versions on the street quickly and were usually voiced at Tubby's studio in the Waterhouse district of Kingston. In the early 1980s, Lee purchased Gibbs' studio in Duhaney Park, and continued producing, albeit on a less prolific basis than in the 1970s.

In 1983, Lee produced the first album by future star Beenie Man, titled The Invincible Beany Man (The 10 Year Old D.J. Wonder).

In March 2015 a fire at Lee's Gorgon Entertainment Studio destroyed equipment with a value estimated by Lee at JA$100 million.

Recognition 
In 1982 an episode of the Channel 4 documentary series Deep Roots was dedicated to Lee. Filmed in the control room of King Tubby's studio, it included a lengthy conversation with him and some of the musicians he has worked with over the years including Delroy Wilson, Johnny Clarke, Prince Jazzbo and Jackie Edwards. It then shows Lee producing a dub while Prince Jammy mixes. The program was released on DVD in January 2008.

In 2008 he was awarded the Order of Distinction by the Jamaican Government in recognition of his contribution to Jamaican music.

In 2013 a documentary film was released, I Am The Gorgon – Bunny 'Striker' Lee and the Roots of Reggae, directed by Diggory Kenrick, telling the story of Lee's life from childhood to the present, featuring U Roy, Dennis Alcapone, Lee "Scratch" Perry, Sly and Robbie, Johnny Clarke, John Holt and others.

Personal life
Lee had one son, Errol Lee (born 1968), with singer Marlene Webber. Errol was believed to be running a non-profit organisation, Caring Kids' Concerts, which mentors young people using music, as of October 2020. 

At the time of Lee's death, his wife was Annette Wong-Lee, mother to four of his children: two sons, Edward Jr. and Kirk, and two daughters, Toni Ann and Bonnie Lee.

Death
Lee died at the age of 79 from heart failure  on 6 October 2020.  He had been suffering from several health issues, including kidney problems relating to diabetes, for some time.

References

External links
 CD Times meets Bunny Lee
 

"Dub Echoes", a documentary about dub's influence on the birth of drum n bass, electronic music and hip hop

1941 births
2020 deaths
Musicians from Kingston, Jamaica
Jamaican record producers
Jamaican reggae musicians
Officers of the Order of Distinction